Henry Gisborne may refer to:

 Henry Fyshe Gisborne (1813–1841), Australian public servant
 Henry Paterson Gisborne (1888–1953), British solicitor and politician